Preobrazhensky is a Russian masculine surname, its feminine counterpart is Preobrazhenskaya. It may refer to

Alexander Preobrazhensky, Russian pedagogue
Boris Preobrazhensky, Soviet otolaryngologist and academician, Hero of Socialist Labor
Konstantin Preobrazhensky, writer on KGB subjects
Mikhail Preobrazhensky, architect
Nikolay Preobrazhensky, Soviet otolaryngologist
Olga Preobrajenska (1871–1962), ballerina of the Russian Imperial Ballet
Olga Preobrazhenskaya (director) (1881–1971), Russian and Soviet actress and film director
Pavel Preobrazhensky, Russian geologist
Sofiya Preobrazhenskaya, Russian opera singer, People's Artist of the USSR
Vasily Khrisanfovich Preobrazhensky, Russian writer
Vasily Petrovich Preobrazhensky, Russian writer
Yevgeni Preobrazhensky, (1886–1937) Bolshevik and economist
Yevgeny Nikolayevich Preobrazhensky, Soviet military leader

Fictional characters
Professor Preobrazhensky, surgeon, from the novel Heart of a Dog by Mikhail Bulgakov

Russian-language surnames